Chen Feng may refer to:

 Chen Feng (businessman) (born 1953), Chinese businessman
 Chen Feng (diplomat) (1916–1986), Chinese diplomat
 Chen Feng (fencer) (born 1980), Chinese fencer
 Chen Feng (table tennis) (born 1994), table tennis player from Singapore
 Chen Feng (volleyball) (born 1969), Chinese male volleyball player

See also
Fung Permadi (born 1967), also known as Chen Feng, Indonesian-Taiwanese badminton player